Giovanni di Ottonello (Bologna, active from 1375 to 1398) was an Italian painter of the Gothic period.

Little is known of his life. He painted a large fresco of the Virgin and Child with Angelic Musicians for the arcades of the church of San Giacomo Maggiore, now on display in Pinacoteca Nazionale of Bologna.

References

14th-century births
Year of death unknown
14th-century Italian painters
Italian male painters
Painters from Bologna
Gothic painters